Greg Austin may refer to:
Greg Austin (rugby) (born 1963), Australian rugby league and union player
Greg Austin (actor) (born 1992), British actor
Greg Austin (American football) (born 1983), American football player